Winfred can mean:
Winfred, South Dakota
Saint Boniface (Winfrid/Winfred)
Winfred (bishop), bishop of Mercia and Lindsey, successor to Chad of Mercia